The 2017–18 Brown Bears men's basketball team represented Brown University during the 2017–18 NCAA Division I men's basketball season. The Bears, led by sixth-year head coach Mike Martin, played their home games at the Pizzitola Sports Center in Providence, Rhode Island as members of the Ivy League. They finished the season 11–16, 4–10 in Ivy League play to finish in seventh place and fail to qualify for the Ivy League tournament.

Previous season 
The Bears finished the 2016–17 season 13–17, 4–10 in Ivy League play to finish in a three-way tie for last place. They failed to qualify for the inaugural Ivy League tournament.

Offseason

Departures

2017 recruiting class

2018 recruiting class

Roster

Schedule and results

|-
!colspan=9 style=| Non-conference regular season

|-
!colspan=9 style=| Ivy League regular season

Source

References

Brown Bears men's basketball seasons
Brown
Brown
Brown